Florelle (born Odette Élisa Joséphine Marguerite Rousseau, 9 August 1898 – 28 September 1974) was a French soprano singer and actress. She gained fame as Polly Peachum in the French film The Threepenny Opera, after which she had numerous other film roles. In the 1940s, she retired from the stage, but continued to make film appearances during the war.

Early life 
She was born as Odette Élisa Joséphine Marguerite Rousseau on 9 August 1898 in Les Sables-d'Olonne, Vendée. She came from a wealthy family living in the district of La Chaume, the oldest in the town of Sables-d'Olonne. Her father, an employee of the town hall, left his job to go into business and the family came to live in Paris; her mother worked at the café La Cigale.

Career 
Odette began her stage career at the age of 13, singing at the Théâtre de l'Ambigu-Comique and the Moulin Rouge. She is notably the partner of Raimu beginning in a sketch entitled "Le Marseillais et la Parigote". She worked in different establishments, then, in 1914, left for her first tour abroad with the troupe of "L'Européen"; It was then that she adopted the pseudonym of Florelle, named after a singer in the troupe, Jean Flor. The tour was interrupted at the beginning of August in Vienna, Austria, by the outbreak of World War I.

After the war, she was noticed by Maurice Chevalier, with whom she participated in three films in the early 1920s. Florelle nevertheless remained attached to the music hall; in 1925, she was chosen as an understudy for Mistinguett and as such was the leader of the Moulin-Rouge review "This is Paris" in a tour of South America.  Back in Paris, she conducted a second version of "This is Paris" from 1927;  in 1928–29, she again toured internationally in Europe;  It was then that she was noticed by the Austrian filmmaker Georg Wilhelm Pabst.

During the 1930s, she devoted herself a lot to the cinema, where her activity was intense from 1930 to 1936;  after L'Opéra de quat'sous, she toured again with Pabst (L'Atlantide), but also with Robert Siodmak (Tumultes), Raymond Bernard ( Les Misérables), Fritz Lang (Liliom) and Jean Renoir (The Crime of Monsieur Lange).  On stage, in 1934 she played the title role of the musical Marie Galante by Jacques Deval, in which she found the music of Kurt Weill, but which does not meet with success.  She records several discs, whether or not related to the films she was filming.

Florelle's career subsequently declined: with her only notable post-war film was Gervaise (1956) by René Clément.

Death 
She lived for a few years running a café in Sables-d'Olonne.  She returned to Paris for a while, then returned to Les Sables, living until her death in La Roche-sur-Yon, Vendée, at age 76 in a certain oblivion and, it seems, in poverty.

Selected filmography

References

External links 

Florelle – Cinémathèque française
Photographs and literature

1898 births
1974 deaths
People from Les Sables-d'Olonne
French film actresses
French silent film actresses
20th-century French actresses